Marianne Merchez (born 25 October 1960 in Uccle) is a Belgian doctor from the Catholic University of Louvain and a former European Space Agency astronaut.
She is certified in aerospace medicine and in industrial medicine, and she is also a professional pilot (holds a Belgian Air Transport Pilot License from Civil Aviation School, former co-pilot Boeing 737).

Merchez has extensive experience as a consultant in human factors. Her predilection field is human relationships and communication and she integrates her training in brief systemic therapy and Ericksonian hypnosis in daily personal and professional situations. Merchez's hobbies include classical music, walking, and cycling.

She is married to former Italian ESA astronaut Maurizio Cheli with whom she co-authored Tutto in un istante: le decisioni che tracciano il viaggio di una vita.

References

External links
 Official website
 Marianne Merchez on Encyclopedia Astronautica

Living people
1960 births
People from Uccle
Women astronauts
Physician astronauts
Belgian astronauts
Belgian women aviators